Dudley Nichols (April 6, 1895 – January 4, 1960) was an American screenwriter and film director. He was the first person to decline an Academy Award, as part of a boycott to gain recognition for the Screen Writers Guild; he would later accept his Academy Award for Best Original Screenplay in 1938.

Biography
Dudley Nichols was born April 6, 1895, in Wapakoneta, Ohio. He studied at the University of Michigan where he was active member of the Sigma chapter of Theta Xi fraternity.

After working as a reporter for the New York World, Nichols moved to Hollywood in 1929 and became one of the most highly regarded screenwriters of the 1930s and 1940s. He collaborated on many films over many years with director John Ford, and was also noted for his work with George Cukor, Howard Hawks, Fritz Lang and Jean Renoir.

Nichols wrote or co-wrote the screenplays for films including Bringing Up Baby (1938), Stagecoach (1939), For Whom the Bell Tolls (1943), Scarlet Street (1945), And Then There Were None (1945), The Bells of St. Mary's (1945), Pinky (1949) and The Tin Star (1957).

Nichols initially declined the Academy Award he received for The Informer, due to a dispute between the Screen Writers Guild, of which he was a founder, and the Academy of Motion Picture Arts and Sciences. He collected the award at the 1938 Oscar ceremony. He served as president of the Screen Writers Guild in 1937 and 1938.

He also co-wrote the documentary The Battle of Midway, which won the 1942 Academy Award for Best Documentary Feature.

Nichols produced and directed three films—Government Girl (1943), Sister Kenny (1946) and Mourning Becomes Electra (1947)—for which he also wrote the screenplay.

Awards
In 1954 he received the Laurel Award for Screenwriting Achievement from the Writers Guild of America.

Death
He died in Hollywood of cancer in 1960 and was interred in the Hollywood Forever Cemetery.

Filmography

References

External links

 
 
 
 
 Dudley Nichols Papers. Yale Collection of American Literature, Beinecke Rare Book and Manuscript Library.

 
1895 births
1960 deaths
20th-century American male writers
20th-century American novelists
American male novelists
American male screenwriters
American mystery writers
Best Adapted Screenplay Academy Award winners
Burials at Hollywood Forever Cemetery
Deaths from cancer in California
People from Wapakoneta, Ohio
University of Michigan alumni
20th-century American screenwriters